Augusto Arduino Rollandin (born 13 June 1949 in Brusson, Aosta Valley, Italy) is an Italian politician and veterinarian. He is a member of the Valdostan Union, a center-right, pro-autonomy Italian political party active in the Aosta Valley.

Career
From 4 January 1984 to 25 June 1990, and again from 1 July 2008 to 10 March 2017, Rollandin served as the President of Aosta Valley.

In July 2013, Rollandin was re-elected to the presidency by a coalition of center-right, pro-autonomy parties consisting of the Valdostan Union (UV) and the Edelweiss (SA). The coalition government, led by the Valdostan Union, lost 14 percentage points in the May 2013 Aosta Valley regional election, a decline from the 2008 election results, but still retained an absolute majority in the Council of the Valley. Rollandin's coalition was supported by 18 of the 35 Council members.

In his July 2013 speech to the Council upon his re-election, Rolladin promised that his government would pay "the utmost attention" to the French language, which shares official status in the Aosta Valley with Italian. He also reiterated the "relevance" in "cultural policies" of the Aosta Valley's two regional languages, Franco-Provençal (also called Valdôtain locally) and Walser German.

References

1949 births
Presidents of Aosta Valley
Politicians of Aosta Valley
Italian veterinarians
Valdostan Union politicians
Living people
Italian politicians convicted of crimes